The Compagnie des arts de Paris was a military unit of the French Revolutionary Wars. It was formed on 6 September 1792 in the Louvre section and was made up of students of Letters and Sciences, particularly from the école de Droit and écoles des Beaux-Arts. It paraded before the Legislative Assembly on 8 September 1792 and was incorporated on 23 September 1792 into the Bataillon 9 bis, then at Châlons-en-Champagne and known as the Bataillon de l'arsenal or Arsenal battalion. It was disbanded at the end of February 1793.

Its volunteers included its captain Jacques Lemercier (sculptor), sous-lieutenant Jean-Baptiste Francesqui (sculptor known as Fransechi-Delorme),  sous-officier Louis-François Lejeune (painter), private Jacques-Augustin-Catherine Pajou (painter) and the future economist Jean-Baptiste Say.

Republican military units and formations of France in the French Revolutionary Wars
1792 establishments in France
1793 disestablishments
Culture of the French Revolution
French art